The Korg DRM-1 Digital Rhythm module built by Korg, in late 1987. It was introduced during 1987 Summer NAMM industry trade show in Chicago.

Features 
The Korg DRM-1 Digital Rhythm Module is an multi-timbral tone generator, that can be played from CV triggered drum pads (any brand) or via MIDI.

For use with all drum pads (except Korg?). The Korg DRM-1 previewed at the 1987 summer NAMM with a complimentary Korg electronic drum kit. However, weeks later Korg announced they were halting manufacture of the electronic drum kit. Speculation was Yamaha's takeover of Korg Inc may have had something to do with it. This resulted in "The Missing Link" ad campaign, highlighting the rhythm module could be controlled by any kind of drum set. The ad image shows a Yamaha PTT8, Simmons SDS-V, and Clavia DDRUM electronic pads mixed with a 1987 Yamaha 9000 Recording Custom acoustic drum kit.

Hardware 
The Korg DRM-1 measures 1.7"x 19"x 12.4" (H x W x D) and it's one units tall. The module has a 16 x 2 LCD display window. All patch data is shown here from selected voice to parameter information. To the left of the window is a 1/4" headphone jack. Next to that are four PCM ROM/RAM card slots for saving or adding additional sounds. To the right of the display is a Remote Control switch, and power button. No additional controls are located on the front panel of the DRM-1.

The unit comes with a Remove Control Unit (DRM-1R) which has the necessary buttons for accessing the features of the rack: Data Transfer, MIDI, System, settings, and patterns. It is complicated to use during voice and sequence programming, however it is more practical for selecting settings or playback during live gigs. Korg over-estimated the usefulness of a remote control due to RF interference, possibility of being lost/damaged, difficulty pressing tiny buttons, and challenges seeing the LCD from across the kit .

Voice Synthesis 
The DRM-1 includes 12-bit Digital to Analog PCM wave memory synthesis type. The production of sound is organized into timbres, voices, and settings as follows:

 Includes 23 internal preset timbres (additional timbres can be imported from Korg DDD-1/5 ROM cards) which parameters can be edited to create Voices.
 These Voices receive their own Timbre, Sound mode (Poly, Mono, Exclusive), Pitch, Volume, Pan, Phase, Pad Settings, MIDI, and Output settings.
 The pitch is raised through a process called Drop-Sample, where data words are skipped over in a periodic way to raise the pitch. This method leads to distortion of timbre, most noticeable on Cymbals.
 Each Voice can be assigned a Main timbre and a Sub timbre, allowing the timbre to change as velocity is increased. This feature is unique to the Korg module during this time.
 Up to 256 different voices can be stored in internal memory or a RAM card, and up to 16 Voices can be grouped together into a Setting.
 16 Settings can be stored on internal memory or RAM cards.

Sequencer 
The DRM-1 also includes 4,400 note built-in sequencer for recording and play-back of rhythm patterns and songs.

 Can record from either drum pads or external MIDI controller.
 It employs a real-time input system by means of punch-in, punch-out, or overdubbing.
 Includes note quantization (called Resolution) from 1/1 through 1/64.
 Up to 16 patterns and 16 songs can be saved to internal memory. RAM cards can be used to expand sequencer memory.

External Control 
There are seven input jacks for use with 1/4" balanced drum pads. The DRM-1 has a drum pad default setting which initializes when powered up (Pad 1 is Snare Drum, Pad 2 is Bass etc). For each drum pad the Pad Sensitivity, Pad Parameters, and Pad Function can be set as Follows:

 The Pad Sensitivity value can be adjusted to make sure the Velocity ranges for pianissimo and fortissimo accordingly.
 The Pad Parameters include Trigger Level (minimum input level to respond to); Voice Change Level (level to change from MAIN to SUB voices); Inhibit Time (period before accepting another input signal)
 The Pad Function allows a pad to also control five sequencer functions (pattern start/stop and next/previous pattern).

Audio Output 
The DRM-1 consists of a pair of 1/4" unbalanced stereo OUTPUT jacks and eight 1/4" unbalanced MULTI OUT jacks. The stereo pan (pan-pot parameter) controls each individual voice output in up to seven positions across the stereo range. The pan-pot parameter can be modified with velocity and keynote numbers. Assigning a voice output to MULTI OUT, automatically switches the sound mode to MONO (great for Bass and Toms). This could have undesired effect for cymbals, which benefit from Poly-mode.

Memory/ Storage 
The DRM-1 is fully compatible with the library of ROM sound card that Korg produced for the DDD-1 and DDD-5 drum machines. There are about 45 official Korg cards around plus third-part:

Notable Users/Endorsers

References

External links 

 Polynominal | Korg DRM-1
 Encyclotronic | Korg DRM-1 Digital Rhythm Module

Korg synthesizers